The Toledo Mercurys is a discontinued International Hockey League franchise from Toledo, Ohio. The Toledo Franchise was the first IHL franchise to be granted outside of the Windsor-Detroit area, for the cost of $1000 to Virgil Gladeaux of Toledo. The Mercurys existed 15 seasons in total from 1947 to 1962 with some minor naming variations. Toledo was successful on the ice, being the first IHL team to win multiple Turner Cup championships, and the first to do so consecutively.

History

The Mercurys won the Turner during their first year of operation in the 1947–48 season. Toledo defeated the Windsor Hettche Spitfires four games to one in the IHL championship series. Team coach and manager Andy Mulligan had signed nine players from his native Manitoba to build the team, including team captain and right-winger Max Labovitch, center Barney O'Connell and left wing Jake Kernahan . The Mercurys later won the United States Amateur hockey title, defeating the Elveth Rangers in two games, and the New York Rovers in three games.

In the 1948–49 season, the team played in both the north and south division of the IHL, because the team owners wanted to play more games. The Mercurys of the north division won the J. P. McGuire Trophy that year by capturing the IHL North title. In a rematch of the previous season's IHL championship, Windsor defeated Toledo four games to three.

For the 1949–50 season, the team was known as the Toledo Buckeyes while playing in the Eastern Amateur Hockey League. They were sponsored by the former Buckeye Brewing Company in Toledo. The team returned to the IHL in 1950 known again as the Mercurys. Toledo won consecutive Turner Cups in 1950–51 and 1951–52 defeating the Grand Rapids Rockets in the finals both seasons.

In the 1955–56 season, the Mercurys played some home games in Marion, Ohio at the Veterans Memorial Coliseum, hence being known as the Toledo-Marion Mercurys. The Mercurys split home games between arenas again for the 1959–60 season. The Toledo-St. Louis Mercurys played some home games in St. Louis, Missouri at the St. Louis Arena.

The Mercurys franchise folded after the 1961–62 season. The International Hockey League returned to Toledo in 1963, with the Toledo Blades franchise.

Season-by-season record

Franchise records

All-time leaders

Single season leaders

References

External links
 IHL franchise and championship information 
A to Z encyclopedia of ice hockey
International Hockey League history
Manitoba connection with the Toledo, Ohio Mercurys in 1948

International Hockey League (1945–2001) teams
Sports teams in Toledo, Ohio
Eastern Hockey League teams
Defunct ice hockey teams in the United States
Ice hockey clubs established in 1947
Sports clubs disestablished in 1962
1947 establishments in Ohio
1962 disestablishments in Ohio